The 1866 Oregon gubernatorial election took place on June 4, 1866 to elect the governor of the U.S. state of Oregon. The election matched Republican George Lemuel Woods against Democrat James Kerr Kelly.

Results

References

Gubernatorial
1866
Oregon
June 1866 events